Tore Bjonviken (born 2 January 1975) is a retired Norwegian cross-country skier.

At the Junior World Ski Championships he achieved a tenth place in 1994, and a seventh place and a bronze medal in 1995. He made his World Cup debut in 1996, with a 57th and 45th place. In the 1996–97 he participated in a single World Cup race, nonetheless achieving a second place in the Sunne sprint in March 1997. His first top-30 placement in a distance race came in November 1997 at Beitostølen where he placed 25th.

Altogether, he made the top 10 twelve times in the World Cup, repeating his second place in a sprint once, and achieving two third places in 15 kilometre races. Bjonviken also competed in the World Ski Championships on one occasion, recording a 44th place at the FIS Nordic World Ski Championships 2003. His final World Cup outing came at the Holmenkollen ski festival in March 2005, when he contested the 50 km without finishing. Later that year he was diagnosed with cancer, but beat the disease in 2007. He attended the Norwegian Police University College.

He represents the sports club Fossum IF.

Cross-country skiing results
All results are sourced from the International Ski Federation (FIS).

World Championships

World Cup

Season standings

Individual podiums

 4 podiums (4 )

Team podiums
 3 victories – (3 ) 
 6 podiums – (5 , 1 )

References

1975 births
Living people
Sportspeople from Bærum
Norwegian male cross-country skiers